Star is a given name and a surname. Notable people with the name incldude:

Surname
 Darren Star (born 1961), American producer, director and writer
 Jeffree Star (born 1985), American CEO of Jeffree Star Cosmetics
 Ryan Star (born 1978), American singer-songwriter
 Susan Leigh Star (1954–2010), American sociologist

Given name
 Star Jones (born 1962), American co-host of the television show The View, lawyer, journalist and writer
 Star Lotulelei (born 1989), National Football League player
 Star Parker (born 1956), American columnist, Republican politician, author, and conservative political activist
 Star Simpson, American engineer and inventor
 Star Stowe (1956–1997), American model and Playboy Playmate of the Month

Fictional Characters 

 Star, a half-vampire from the film The Lost Boys

See also
Starr (given name)
Starr (surname)